Roger Payne (16 July 1956 – 12 July 2012) was a British mountaineer. He was formerly general secretary of the British Mountaineering Council (BMC) and a qualified mountain guide from 1983, taking part in over 20 expeditions to the Karakoram and Himalayan ranges, including K2 and the north face of Changabang. He was an avalanche instructor and climbed in the Alps every year from 1977.

Biography
Payne grew up in Hammersmith, London, and took an education degree in 1983 at Sunderland Polytechnic where he was president of the mountaineering club. He then became a teacher and climbing instructor and he later moved to Leysin, Switzerland.

Payne was president of the British Mountain Guides Association and, after his death, was given honorary membership of the International Federation of Mountain Guide Associations (IFMGA)

Death
Payne was killed aged 55 with eight other climbers by an avalanche whilst traversing Mont Maudit, on the Mont Blanc massif, near Chamonix in the French Alps on 12 July 2012.

Notable climbs
2007 - Brumkhangshe, Pheling, Chombu, Eagle Peak
2006 - Chogyl, Frontier Peak, Koktang, Ratong
2005 - Lama Lamani, Mount Tinchenchang
2004 - Thangsing Valley
2004 - Chomolhari
2003 - Mount Grosvenor
2002 - Island Peak
2000 - Pumari Chhish
1999 - Pumari Chhish
1998 - Meru
1997 - Changabang
1996 - Changabang
1995 - Tirsuli West
1994 - Nanda Devi East
1993 - K2
1992 - Broad Peak
1991 - Khan Tengri, Pobeda
1989 - Lobuje East
1988 - Mount Foraker, Mount McKinley
1987 - Gasherbrum 6, Gasherbrum 2
1986 - Rusac, Peru
1985 - Millpuqrahu, Kayish
1983 - Meru
1982 - Mount McKinley

See also
Climbing

References

External links 
 Official site

1956 births
2012 deaths
Alumni of the University of Sunderland
Deaths in avalanches
English mountain climbers
Mountaineering deaths
Natural disaster deaths in France